The Arbitration Act 1697 (9 Will. III c.15) was an Act of the Parliament of England of 1697.

It was the first statute in the United Kingdom to expressly provide for arbitration of disputes, although the practice of arbitration had been going on for many years before.  The statute was drafted by John Locke at the request of the Board of Trade.

See also

Crown and Parliament Recognition Act 1689
Parliament Act (disambiguation)

References

Acts of the Parliament of England
1697 in law
Arbitration law